Coombes Holloway Halt railway station was a railway station in Halesowen, England, on the Great Western Railway & Midland Railway's Joint Halesowen Railway line from Old Hill to Longbridge. The station was intermediate stopping point between Halesowen and Old Hill, and was only ¾ of a mile from Old Hill station. It had a short lived life as a station of only 22 years. The station site is now covered by a small industrial unit, alongside which the disused embankment can be seen.

References

Disused railway stations in Dudley
Railway stations in Great Britain opened in 1905
Railway stations in Great Britain closed in 1927
Former Midland Railway stations
Former Great Western Railway stations
Halesowen